Toxiphobia in non-human animals is rejection of foods with tastes, odors, or appearances which are followed by illness resulted from toxins found in these foods. In human animals, toxiphobia is the irrational fear of poisons and being poisoned.

See also
 Food poisoning

References

Phobias
Poisons